Scrobipalpa artemisiella (thyme moth) is a moth of the family Gelechiidae. It is found in most of Europe (except Portugal and Norway), Turkey and Syria through the Caucasus and Central Asia to Irkutsk and Mongolia. It has also been recorded from North America, but this records requires confirmation.

The wingspan is 10–12 mm. Terminal joint of palpi as long as second or hardly longer. Forewings are dark brown, whitish -sprinkled, more or less streaked longitudinally with ferruginous, dorsal area visually lighter; stigmata somewhat elongate, black, first discal rather beyond plical; usually a black mark on fold beyond plical ; some black dots before apex
and on termen. Hindwings 1, light grey, darker terminally. The larva is greenish ; dorsal and subdorsal lines darker ; head pale brown; 2 brown-marked.

Adults are on wing from June to July.

The larvae feed on Thymus praecox arcticus, Thymus pulegioides, Thymus serpyllum and Satureja montana. They initially mine the leaves of their host plant. The mine has the form of a small, brown, full depth blotch mine without frass. The mine is made young leaves. They feed from a protective spinning. Older larvae leave the mine and engage in upper-surface window feeding, while hidden among spun leaves. Larvae can be found from May to June. They are dull brownish green with five purplish-brown length lines and a black head.

Subspecies
Scrobipalpa artemisiella artemisiella
Scrobipalpa artemisiella oreocyrniella Petry, 1904 (Sardinia, Corsica)

References

Moths described in 1833
Scrobipalpa
Moths of Japan
Moths of Europe
Moths of Asia